The Graham House was a historic one-and-a-half-story cottage in Rose Hill, Mississippi. It was built in the 1860s by Narcissus Daniel Graham, a farmer who lived here with his second wife, née Mary Josephine Spencer. Graham began building the house prior to the American Civil War of 1861–1865, and it was completed postbellum. It was designed in the Greek Revival style. It was listed on the National Register of Historic Places on April 10, 2008.

References

Greek Revival architecture in Mississippi
National Register of Historic Places in Jasper County, Mississippi